The Media of Visalia serves a large population in the Visalia, California area.

The major daily newspaper in the area is the Visalia Times-Delta/Tulare Advance-Register. There are also a number of smaller regional newspapers, alternative weeklies and magazines, including the Valley Voice Newspaper. Many cities adjacent to Visalia also have their own daily newspapers whose coverage and availability overlaps into certain Visalia neighborhoods.

Visalia arts, culture and nightlife news is also covered by a number of local online guides.

Television stations in Visalia
Visalia is in the Fresno media market and thus primarily receives Fresno-based stations.

Visalia
Visalia, California
Visalia, California
Mass media in Tulare County, California